Mark Shulman may refer to:

Mark Shulman (author) (born 1962), American author
Mark Shulman (rugby league) (1951–2022), Australian rugby league player

See also
Shulman (surname)